Kunghit Island is an island in the Canadian province of British Columbia. It is the southernmost island in the Haida Gwaii archipelago, located to the south of Moresby Island. The southernmost point of Kunghit Island, called Cape St James, is used to delineate the boundary between Hecate Strait and Queen Charlotte Sound. The only habitation on Kunghit Island is Rose Harbour, on its north shore.

Houston Stewart Channel separates Kunghit and Moresby Islands.

See also 
 List of islands of British Columbia

References

External links

Islands of Haida Gwaii
Haida
North Coast Regional District